The Indonesia Handball Association (IHA) is the administrative and controlling body for handball and beach handball in Republic of Indonesia. Founded in 2007, IHA is a member of Asian Handball Federation (AHF) and the International Handball Federation (IHF).

National teams
 Indonesia men's national handball team
 Indonesia men's national junior handball team
 Indonesia women's national handball team

Competitions hosted
IHA had hosted following international championships:

References

External links
 Official website  
 Indonesia at the IHF website.
 Indonesia at the AHF website.

Handball in Indonesia
Handball
Sports organizations established in 2007
2007 establishments in Indonesia
Handball governing bodies
Asian Handball Federation
National members of the International Handball Federation
Organizations based in Jakarta